Štika v rybníce is a 1951 Czechoslovak film starring Josef Kemr.

References

External links
 

1951 films
1950s Czech-language films
Czechoslovak comedy films
1951 comedy films
Czechoslovak black-and-white films
1950s Czech films